Ani Idrus (25 November 1918 – 9 January 1999) was a prominent reporter and co-founder of the Waspada daily newspaper with her husband Mohamad Said on 1947.
Her career started in 1930 as a writer in the Panji Pustaka magazine, Jakarta. On 25 November 2019, Google celebrated her 101st birthday with a Google Doodle.

List of books
 Buku Tahunan Wanita (1953)
 Menunaikan Ibadah Haji ke Tanah Suci (1974)
 Wanita Dulu Sekarang dan Esok (1980)
 Terbunuhnya Indira Gandhi (1984)
 Sekilas Pengalaman dalam Pers dan Organisasi PWI di Sumatra Utara (1985)
 Doa Utama dalam Islam (1987)

References

External links
 Ensiklopedia Tokoh Indonesia

1918 births
1999 deaths
Indonesian journalists
Indonesian women journalists
20th-century journalists